Nicholas George Hennessey (born July 2, 1986) is a former gridiron football offensive tackle. He was signed by the Buffalo Bills as an undrafted free agent in 2009. He played college football at Colgate.

Family life
Nicholas is the middle child of Jeanne and Mike Hennessey.  He has an older sister, Jaclyn Hennessey Ford, and a younger sister, Megan Hennessey.

Early years
Hennessey attended Danvers High School from 2000–2004 and graduated in 2004. During his senior year, he was the captain the football, basketball and lacrosse teams.

Professional career

Buffalo Bills
Hennessey spent the bulk of the 2009 season on the Bills' Practice Squad, before being activated for one game during Week 17.  He was waived by the Bills after the 2010 preseason.

BC Lions
On October 18, 2010, the BC Lions of the Canadian Football League signed Hennessey to their practice roster. He was released on November 5. The team re-signed him for the 2011 season on December 8.

Omaha Nighthawks
Hennessey was signed by the Omaha Nighthawks of the United Football League on August 23, 2011.

Hamilton Tiger-Cats
It was announced on April 13, 2012 that Hennessey had signed with the Hamilton Tiger-Cats.

References

External links
Just Sports Stats

1986 births
Living people
People from Danvers, Massachusetts
Sportspeople from Essex County, Massachusetts
Players of American football from Massachusetts
American football offensive tackles
American football offensive guards
Colgate Raiders football players
Buffalo Bills players
BC Lions players
Omaha Nighthawks players
Hamilton Tiger-Cats players